David Revere McFadden was Chief Curator and Vice President for Programs and Collections at the Museum of Arts & Design in New York City from 1997 until his retirement in 2013.

Education
McFadden did his undergraduate and graduate work at the University of Minnesota, and received his graduate degree in the History of Art (Renaissance and Baroque Studies), with a secondary major in Chinese history.

References

External links
 Pew Fellowships in the Arts

Year of birth missing (living people)
Living people
University of Minnesota College of Liberal Arts alumni
American art curators
Knights First Class of the Order of the Lion of Finland